Sankt Johann (German for "Saint John") may refer to the following places:

Germany
St. Johann (Reutlingen), a municipality in the district of Reutlingen, Baden-Württemberg
Sankt Johann, Mainz-Bingen, a municipality in the district Mainz-Bingen, Rhineland-Palatinate
Sankt Johann, Mayen-Koblenz, a municipality in the district Mayen-Koblenz, Rhineland-Palatinate
Sankt Johann (Saarbrücken), a borough of Saarbrücken, Saarland

Austria
Sankt Johann im Pongau, in the state of Salzburg
in Styria:
Sankt Johann am Tauern
Sankt Johann bei Herberstein
Sankt Johann im Saggautal
Sankt Johann in der Haide
Sankt Johann-Köppling
Sankt Johann in Tirol, in Tyrol
Sankt Johann im Walde, in Tyrol
Sankt Johann am Walde, in Upper Austria
Sankt Johann am Wimberg, in Upper Austria

Switzerland
Alt St. Johann, in the Canton of St. Gallen
St. Johann, Schaffhausen, in the city of Schaffhausen

See also
San Giovanni (disambiguation)
Saint-Jean (disambiguation)
Saint John (disambiguation)
Saint Juan (disambiguation)
Sant Joan (disambiguation)
San Juan (disambiguation)
São João (disambiguation)